Moisei Iakovlevich Beregovsky (1892–1961) was a Soviet Jewish folklorist and ethnomusicologist from Ukraine, who published mainly in Russian and Yiddish. He has been called the "foremost ethnomusicologist of Eastern European Jewry".  His research and life's work included the collection, transcription and analysis of the melodies, texts and culture of Yiddish folk song, wordless melodies (nigunim), East European Jewish instrumental music for both dancing and listening (klezmer music), Purim plays (Yiddish: פורים-שפיל / purim-shpil), and exploration of the relationship between East European Jewish and Ukrainian traditional music.

Biography

Early life
Beregovsky was born into the family of a Jewish parochial primary school (kheyder) teacher in the village of Termakhovka, then in the Kiev Governorate of the Russian Empire. As a child he participated as a boy-chorister in a local synagogue. He studied in the conservatories of Kiev (composition and cello in 1915–1920) and Petrograd (1922–1924). He also worked as a vocal coach in Jewish orphanages in Petrograd and Moscow under Joel Engel.

Career in music research
From 1928–1936 he was the head of Musical Folklore section of the Institute for Jewish Proletarian Arts of the Academy of Sciences of the Ukrainian SSR. From 1936–1949 he was a researcher in the Institute for Language and Literature, head of the Office of Folklore of the Jewish Arts Section of the Academy of Sciences of the Ukrainian SSR, and head of the Office for Musical Ethnography. He was a teacher in the Kiev Conservatory from 1947, in the sections of music theory and folklore).

From roughly 1929 to 1947, Beregovsky made ethnographic trips collecting secular Jewish music in various parts of Soviet Ukraine.  His works make up the largest and most carefully notated collection of its kind in pre-WWII and early postwar Europe. He was especially interested in Klezmer music, which had been far less collected and studied than Yiddish folksong. By 1941 he said he had managed to collect 700 examples of the genre, which included presumably his own field recordings, musical manuscripts, and collections he inherited from an older scholar, Susman Kiselgof. Mark Slobin, who arranged and republished much of Beregovsky's collection in the United States, has said in an interview that Beregovsky "was the only person to do this for Yiddish music, and he was an excellent ethnomusicologist."  He made roughly 2,000 field recordings on 700 phonograph cylinders.

In 1944, Beregovsky received his Ph.D. from the Moscow Conservatory, writing his dissertation on the topic of Jewish instrumental folk music.  He worked to meticulously expand the work of previous Eastern European Jewish musicologists and ethnographers such as A.Z. Idelsohn, Yoel Engel, S. An-Sky, and Y.L. Cahan.

He continued his research during the period of Stalinist repression of the 1930s-50s, under what must have been great ideological pressure, as state-funded musical research in the Soviet Union  necessarily followed Marxist-Leninist lines.

The institute itself was later closed down and many of its members exiled and disgraced.  In 1949, Beregovsky's department was closed and he was arrested in 1950 at the height of Joseph Stalin’s anti-Semitic campaign and sent to Tayshet, in the Irkutsk region, where he remained from 1951 to 1955. He was released and 'rehabilitated' in 1956. He returned to Kiev, where he lived the rest of his life.

Beregovsky's archive of wax cylinders, many from the pre-WWI Jewish Ethnographic Expeditions directed by Sh. Ansky, was thought by many to have been destroyed during World War II, but was found to be in the Vernadsky National Library of Ukraine in Kyiv/Kiev in the 1990s.  Some of Beregovsky's most significant work and collections have been published in English by American ethnomusicologist Mark Slobin, beginning in 1982 with Old Jewish Folk Music (University of Pennsylvania Press), followed by a more expansive volume in 2001 devoted to Beregovsky's study of the klezmer instrumental tradition, Jewish Instrumental Folk Music (Syracuse Univ Press), translated by Michael Alpert and Slobin, annotated by Alpert, and edited by Slobin, Robert Rothstein and Alpert. The latter has been reissued in a 2015 second edition, extensively revised by Kurt Bjorling with annotations by Bjorling and Alpert, including the restoration of an entire chapter of text missing in the 2001 edition. Beregovsky's collections of melodies have made their way into the repertoire of many current-day klezmer musicians, including recordings by Joel Rubin, Joshua Horowitz, Alicia Svigals, Pete Rushefsky, Brave Old World, and Veretski Pass. Anna Shternshis of the University of Toronto and Russian-American scholar/avant-bard Psoy Korolenko worked with Beregovsky's archive of song texts, with Shternshis spearheading the production of the 2018 album Yiddish Glory (61st Grammy-nominated).

Works (published)
Jewish Musical Folklore (in Yiddish and Russian), USSR, 1934
Jewish folksongs (in Yiddish) (in collaboration with Itzik Feffer), Kiev, 1938
Jewish Instrumental Folk Music (in Russian) (edited by Max Goldin, translation and transliteration by Velvl Chernin), "Muzyka" Publishing, Moscow, 1987
Jewish wordless tunes (in Russian), "Kompozitor" Publishing, Russia, 1999
Jewish Instrumental Folk Music (edited by Mark Slobin, Robert Rothstein, Michael Alpert) Syracuse University Press, 2001
Purimshpils (in Russian ) (compiled by E. Beregovska), "Dukh i litera" Publishing, Kyiv, 2001
Jewish Instrumental Folk Music, Second Edition (edited by Mark Slobin, Robert Rothstein, Michael Alpert, revised by Kurt Bjorling) www.muziker.org  musical services, Evanston IL USA, 2015

Recordings
Beregovsky’s Wedding, CD (by Joel Rubin’s ensemble), Schott Wergo Publishing, Germany, 1997
Midnight Prayer, CD (by Joel Rubin’s ensemble), Traditional Crossroads, New York City, 2007
1997
Beregovski Suite, CD (by Alicia Svigals & Uli Geissendoerfer), Vegas Records, New York, 2018
Yiddish Glory, Six Degrees Records, 2018

Other sources
Eda Beregovska. Harps hanging off the willows (in Russian), Gesharim Publishing, Jerusalem, Israel - Moscow, Russia, 1994
Dr.Tobias Shklover. "Resurrection of Moses Beregovsky’s heritage" (in Yiddish), The Jewish Daily Forward newspaper, No. 31, 181, April 24, 1998

References

1892 births
1961 deaths
Ukrainian musicians
Jewish Ukrainian musicians
Ukrainian Jews
Soviet Jews
Yiddish-language folklore
Ukrainian folklorists
Soviet rehabilitations
Jewish folklorists
Ethnomusicologists
People from Kiev Governorate
Moscow Conservatory alumni
Soviet musicians